Botrytis narcissicola is a plant pathogen, a fungus that causes narcissus smoulder of daffodils, genus Narcissus.

References

Bibliography 
 T.M. O'Neill, J.W. Mansfield. INFECTION OF NARCISSUS BY BOTRYTIS NARCISSICOLA AND BOTRYTIS CINEREA. 1980. 
 

Sclerotiniaceae
Fungal plant pathogens and diseases